Gamarra may refer to:

Gamarra (surname)
Gamarra, Cesar, a town and municipality in Cesar, Colombia
Gamarra (Málaga), a ward of Bailén-Miraflores, city of Málaga, Spain

See also
Gamarra Mayor, village in Spain
Estadio Juan Maldonado Gamarra, a multi-use stadium in Cutervo Province, Peru 
Mariscal Gamarra District, Peru